Calydna is a genus of butterflies in the family Riodinidae. They are resident in the Neotropics.

Species of Calydna feed as larvae on Olacaceae, Euphorbiaceae, Schoepfia, Ximenia and Conceveiba.

Species list 
 Calydna cabira Hewitson, 1854 French Guiana, Brazil
 Calydna caieta Hewitson, 1854 French Guiana, Brazil
 Calydna calamisa Hewitson, 1854 Brazil
 Calydna candace Hewitson, 1859 Brazil
 Calydna carneia Hewitson, 1859 Brazil
 Calydna catana Hewitson, 1859 Venezuela, Brazil
 Calydna cea Hewitson, 1859 Brazil, Peru
 Calydna charila Hewitson, 1854 Brazil, Peru
 Calydna fissilisima Hall, 2002 Brazil
 Calydna hiria (Godart, [1824]) Brazil, Peru
 Calydna jeannea Hall, 2002 Peru
 Calydna lusca (Geyer, [1835]) Mexico, Peru
 Calydna micra Bates, 1868 Brazil
 Calydna nicolayi Hall, 2002 Peru
 Calydna stolata Brévignon, 1998 French Guiana
 Calydna thersander (Stoll, [1780]) French Guiana, Guyana, Suriname, Brazil
 Calydna sturnula (Geyer, 1837) Mexico, Brazil
 Calydna venusta Godman & Salvin, [1886] Mexico, Panama, Colombia, Venezuela, Trinidad and Tobago, French Guiana, Guyana, Suriname, Brazil

Sources
 Calydna at Markku Savela's website on Lepidoptera

External links
images representing Calydna at Encyclopedia of Life
images representing Calydna at Consortium for the Barcode of Life

Riodininae
Butterfly genera
Taxa named by Edward Doubleday